The 2004 Sun Belt Conference men's basketball tournament was held March 6–9 at E. A. Diddle Arena in Bowling Green, Kentucky.

Top-seed  defeated #3 seed  in the championship game, 67–58, to win their fourth Sun Belt men's basketball tournament.

The Ragin' Cajuns received an automatic bid to the 2004 NCAA tournament as the #14 seed in the Phoenix region. No other Sun Belt members earned bids to the tournament.

Format
Eight of eleven participating Sun Belt members were seeded based on regular season conference records.

Bracket

See also
Sun Belt Conference women's basketball tournament

References

Sun Belt Conference men's basketball tournament
Tournament
Sun Belt Conference men's basketball tournament
Sun Belt Conference men's basketball tournament
College basketball tournaments in Kentucky
Sports in Bowling Green, Kentucky